Haustellum barbieri is a species of sea snail, a marine gastropod mollusk in the family Muricidae, the murex snails or rock snails.

Description
It is a club-shaped sea snail with light color combinations variating between yellow, gray, brown on some cases, and white. It is a big sea snail, measuring over 97.6mm.

Distribution
Most descriptions and reports come mainly from Madagascar.

References

 Houart R. (2014). Living Muricidae of the world. Muricinae. Murex, Promurex, Haustellum, Bolinus, Vokesimurex and Siratus. Harxheim: ConchBooks. 197 pp.

External links
 MNHN, Paris: holotype

Muricidae
Gastropods described in 1993